Taricanus truquii is a species of beetle in the family Cerambycidae. It was described by James Thomson in 1868. It is known from Nicaragua, Mexico, and possibly the United States.

References

Onciderini
Beetles described in 1868